Chiloglottis jeanesii, commonly known as the mountain bird orchid, is a species of orchid endemic to Victoria. It has two broad leaves and a single green to dark purplish brown flower with shiny black, column-like calli on the labellum.

Description
Flowering from November to January.

Taxonomy and naming
Chiloglottis jeanesii was first formally described in 1997 by David Jones from a specimen collected near Toorongo and the description was publish in Muelleria. The specific epithet (jeanesii) honours the botanist and orchid expert Jeffrey Jeanes.

Distribution and habitat
The mountain bird orchid grows in moist to wet forest in mountainous areas in the Sherbrooke Forest, Baw Baw National Park and Dandenong Ranges National Park.

References

External links 

jeanesii
Orchids of Victoria (Australia)
Flora of Victoria (Australia)
Plants described in 1997